Martin Kolář (born 18 September 1983) is a Czech former professional footballer who played as a winger.

Career
Kolář played with AC Ajaccio in Ligue 2, with Stoke City in The Championship (on loan, scoring once against Norwich City), with R.S.C. Anderlecht and K.V.C. Westerlo in the Belgian First Division A and with Helsingborgs IF in Allsvenskan.

Career statistics

References

External links
 
 
 
 

1983 births
Living people
Footballers from Prague
Czech footballers
Association football wingers
Czech Republic youth international footballers
Czech Republic under-21 international footballers
Czech First League players
Czech 2. Liga players
English Football League players
Allsvenskan players
Belgian Pro League players
Ligue 2 players
Cypriot First Division players
Bohemians 1905 players
AC Ajaccio players
R.S.C. Anderlecht players
Stoke City F.C. players
K.V.C. Westerlo players
Helsingborgs IF players
AEP Paphos FC players
Apollon Limassol FC players
Czech expatriate footballers
Czech expatriate sportspeople in England
Expatriate footballers in England
Czech expatriate sportspeople in Belgium
Expatriate footballers in Belgium
Czech expatriate sportspeople in France
Expatriate footballers in France
Czech expatriate sportspeople in Sweden
Expatriate footballers in Sweden
Czech expatriate sportspeople in Cyprus
Expatriate footballers in Cyprus